General transcription factor IIF subunit 2 is a protein that in humans is encoded by the GTF2F2 gene.

Interactions 

GTF2F2 has been shown to interact with POLR2E and HTATSF1.

See also 
 Transcription Factor II F

References

Further reading

External links 
 

Transcription factors